Oatfield may refer to:

Oatfield (confectioner), originating in Letterkenny, County Donegal
Oatfield, Oregon, a census-designated place in the U.S. state of Oregon